Primula capitata, commonly known as the round-headed Himalayan primrose or Asiatic primrose is a species of flowering plant in the family Primulaceae. It is a short-lived perennial, forming semi-evergreen rosettes of 15cm (6inch) pale green, mealy leaves that are finely toothed, oblong-lance-shaped or inversely lance-shaped, with white-mealy undersides. Its flowers are up to 1cm (0.5inch) long, dark purple and tubular, with shallowly lobed petals; they are borne in racemes that form flattened spheres, held on white-mealy stems about 40cm (16inches) high.

Primula capitata is found in moist habitats in alpine areas of Bhutan, Tibet, and Sikkim state in India. Its putative subspecies Primula capitata subsp. sphaerocephala has gained the Royal Horticultural Society's Award of Garden Merit.

References

capitata
Flora of Nepal
Flora of East Himalaya
Flora of Tibet